The 1983 Castilian-Leonese regional election was held on Sunday, 8 May 1983, to elect the 1st Cortes of the autonomous community of Castile and León. All 84 seats in the Cortes were up for election. The election was held simultaneously with regional elections in twelve other autonomous communities and local elections all throughout Spain.

The election granted a victory for the Spanish Socialist Workers' Party (PSOE) with 44.4% of the vote, but at 42 seats the party remained one seat short of an overall majority and at exactly half the size of the Cortes. The People's Coalition, an electoral alliance led by the right-wing People's Alliance (AP) and including the People's Democratic Party (PDP) and the Liberal Union (UL), became the second largest force in the community closely behind the PSOE, with 39 seats and 39.7%. Former Spanish prime minister Adolfo Suárez's Democratic and Social Centre (CDS) and the small Liberal Democratic Party (PDL) both entered the Cortes with two and one seats, respectively. The Communist Party of Spain (PCE), on the other hand, performed poorly, being unable to win any seats and obtaining 2.4% of the share.

Throughout the abstentions from CDS and PDL, the PSOE candidate Demetrio Madrid became the new regional president in a second round of voting, as the PSOE's 42 seats did not secure an absolute majority of seats to be elected in the first round. This would be the only time that the PSOE would go on to form the regional government, as well as the only out of two times—the other being in 2019—that the party would become the most voted political force in a regional election.

Overview

Electoral system
The Cortes of Castile and León were the devolved, unicameral legislature of the autonomous community of Castile and León, having legislative power in regional matters as defined by the Spanish Constitution and the Castilian-Leonese Statute of Autonomy, as well as the ability to vote confidence in or withdraw it from a regional president.

Transitory Provision Second of the Statute established a specific electoral procedure for the first election to the Cortes of Castile and León, to be supplemented by the provisions within Royal Decree-Law 20/1977, of 18 March, and its related regulations. Voting for the Cortes was on the basis of universal suffrage, which comprised all nationals over 18 years of age, registered in Castile and León and in full enjoyment of their political rights. All members of the Cortes of Castile and León were elected using the D'Hondt method and a closed list proportional representation, with an electoral threshold of three percent of valid votes—which included blank ballots—being applied in each constituency. Seats were allocated to constituencies, corresponding to the provinces of Ávila, Burgos, León, Palencia, Salamanca, Segovia, Soria, Valladolid and Zamora, with each being allocated an initial minimum of three seats, as well as one additional member per each 45,000 inhabitants or fraction greater than 22,500.

The use of the D'Hondt method might result in a higher effective threshold, depending on the district magnitude.

Election date
The General Council of Castile and León, in agreement with the Government of Spain, was required to call an election to the Cortes of Castile and León before 31 May 1983. In the event of an investiture process failing to elect a regional president within a two-month period from the first ballot, the Cortes were to be automatically dissolved and a snap election called, with elected deputies merely serving out what remained of their four-year terms.

Parties and candidates
The electoral law allowed for parties and federations registered in the interior ministry, coalitions and groupings of electors to present lists of candidates. Parties and federations intending to form a coalition ahead of an election were required to inform the relevant Electoral Commission within fifteen days of the election call, whereas groupings of electors needed to secure the signature of at least one-thousandth of the electorate in the constituencies for which they sought election—with a compulsory minimum of 500 signatures—disallowing electors from signing for more than one list of candidates.

Below is a list of the main parties and electoral alliances which contested the election:

The electoral disaster of the Union of the Democratic Centre (UCD) in the October 1982 general election and the outcome of its extraordinary congress held in December, in which the party's leadership chose to transform the UCD into a christian democratic political force, brought the party to a process of virtual disintegration as many of its remaining members either switched party allegiances, split into new, independent candidacies or left politics altogether. Subsequent attempts to seek electoral allies ahead of the incoming 1983 local and regional elections, mainly the conservative People's Alliance (AP) and the christian democratic People's Democratic Party (PDP), had limited success due to concerns from both AP and UCD over such an alliance policy: AP strongly rejected any agreement that implied any sort of global coalition with UCD due to the party's ongoing decomposition, and prospects about a possible PDP–UCD merger did not come into fruition because of the latter's reluctance to dilute its brand within another party. By the time the UCD's executive had voted for the liquidation of the party's mounting debts and its subsequent dissolution on 18 February 1983, electoral alliances with the AP–PDP coalition had only been agreed in some provinces of the Basque Country and Galicia.

Together with AP, the PDP had agreed to maintain their general election alliance—now rebranded as the People's Coalition—for the May local and regional elections, with the inclusion of the Liberal Union (UL), a political party created in January 1983 out of independents from the AP–PDP coalition in an attempt to appeal to former UCD liberal voters. The Coalition had seen its numbers soar from late February as a result of many former members from the UCD's christian democratic wing joining the PDP.

Results

Overall

Distribution by constituency

Aftermath

Government formation

1986 investiture
The poor economic situation of a textile company property of the newly-elected regional president Demetrio Madrid, Pekus, weakened his standing within his party and would eventually lead to Madrid's political downfall. In the years previous to his accession to power, Madrid had saved the company from default by borrowing several loans from the Zamora Provincial Savings Bank. By early 1984, Madrid's debts—amounting to 15 million Pta—resulted in an embargo notice over his patrimony, unraveling a crisis within the regional PSOE as the party was about to hold a regional congress in which Madrid's suitability for the office came under scrutiny in light of a possible conflict of interest. On 29 January, a slim majority voted to re-elect Madrid as secretary general, but during the following year the political landscape of the autonomous community would become dominated by the PSOE's internal division over Madrid's management and confrontational style.

In March 1985, amid growing tensions, the PSOE replaced Madrid as their regional secretary general by Juan José Laborda. In July 1985, Madrid sold Pekus to stop criticism on the company's dire economic situation, but a lawsuit was filed against him by the company's workers over the alleged fraudulent sale of the firm. Despite Madrid's will to remain in the post and stand as candidate in the 1987 election for a second term in office, the judicial investigation compromised his personal position, being forced to resign as regional president after his indictment for a societary crime on 29 October 1986, though he would later be acquitted of any wrongdoing. José Constantino Nalda, who served as regional minister of the Presidency and Territorial Administration, was selected to replace Madrid in the post.

Notes

References

1983 in Castile and León
Castile and Leon
Regional elections in Castile and León
May 1983 events in Europe